The men's tournament was won by the team representing .

Preliminary round

 Qualified for quarterfinals
 Eliminated
Source: Paralympic.org

Medal round

Source: Paralympic.org

Classification 5-12
Classification 5/6

 

Classification 7/8

 

Classification 9/10

 

Classification 11/12

 

Source: Paralympic.org

Ranking

References

Men